The 10th congressional district of Missouri was a congressional district for the United States House of Representatives in Missouri from 1873 to 1983. It was eliminated as a result of the redistricting cycle after the 1980 Census. Most of the territory that was part of the 10th at the time it was abolished is now part of the 8th district.

List of members representing the district

References

 Congressional Biographical Directory of the United States 1774–present

10
Former congressional districts of the United States
Constituencies established in 1873
1873 establishments in Missouri
Constituencies disestablished in 1933
1933 disestablishments in Missouri
Constituencies established in 1935
1935 establishments in Missouri
Constituencies disestablished in 1983
1983 disestablishments in Missouri